Șipotu may refer to several entities in Romania:

 Șipotu, a village in Turburea Commune, Gorj County
 Șipotu, a village in Ponoarele Commune, Mehedinți County
 Șipotu, a village in Poroina Mare Commune, Mehedinți County
 Șipotu, a village in Lipănești Commune, Prahova County
 Șipotu, a name for the upper course of the Plescioara in Gorj County
 Șipotu, a tributary of the Putna in Vrancea County
 Șipotu, a tributary of the Râul Mare in Hunedoara County

See also 
 Șipot (disambiguation)